The WAGR ADF class (also known as the Wildflower class) was a six member class of diesel railcars operated by the Western Australian Government Railways between 1949 and 1975.

History
In 1949/50, the Midland Railway Workshops delivered built six diesel railcar sets to replace the Governor sets. Each set had one powered ADF railcar and two ADU trailers. All were named after wildflowers, hence the class name.

The first was launched to the media on 23 August 1949 followed by a demonstration run from Perth to Pinjarra. They entered service shortly after, operating from Perth to Albany, Perth to Geraldton via Wongan Hills and Mullewa, Perth to Merredin, Perth to Chidlow, Perth to Ongerup and Kalgoorlie to Esperance.

All were withdrawn between 1959 and 1963 as daylight country passenger trains were withdrawn and replaced by road coaches.

Three ADFs and four ADUs were refurbished in 1964 to operate the new Bunbury Belle and The Shopper services. A further four ADUs were converted to locomotive hauled carriages. All were written off in 1975 with ADF495 preserved by Rail Heritage WA.

References

5. WAGR 'Wildflower diesel-electric train', datasheet 55311/12/68 with full technical specifications.

External links

Diesel multiple units of Western Australia